Georges Mouton, comte de Lobau (21 February 1770 – 27 November 1838) was a French soldier and political figure who rose to the rank of Marshal of France.

Biography

Born in Phalsbourg, Lorraine, he enlisted in the French Revolutionary Army in 1792. Serving in the early campaigns of the French Revolutionary Wars, he by 1800 he was promoted to the rank of colonel.

He was promoted to général de brigade in 1805, after the establishment of the French Empire, and to général de division in 1807. Mouton distinguished himself in the battles of Jena, Landshut and Aspern-Essling. In 1810, he was created count of Lobau in recognition of his role in the battle of Aspern.

During the Russian Campaign, he acted as a senior aide-de-camp to Emperor Napoleon I of France. He then served with distinction during the 1813 campaign, seeing action at the Battles of Lützen and Bautzen.

After Dominique Vandamme was made prisoner during the battle of Kulm, Lobau commanded the retreat of the remnants of the corps. He served under Laurent Gouvion Saint-Cyr when, upon the retreat after the battle of Leipzig, the latter was trapped in Dresden and after the surrender of these forces he became a prisoner of the Austrian Empire for the rest of the war.

During the Hundred Days, Lobau rallied to Napoleon and was made commander of the VI Infantry Corps which he led in the battles of Ligny and Waterloo. At the Battle of Waterloo he distinguished himself in the defense of Plancenoit against the Prussians.

After the Second Restoration, Lobau was forced to go into exile until he was allowed to return to France in 1818. He was elected to the House of Representatives from 1828 to 1830 as a liberal, and, in 1830, he joined the July Revolution as commander of the National Guard.

As a reward for his services to King Louis-Philippe he was made a Marshal in 1831, the same year he was made a Peer of France. In 1832 and 1834, Lobau was assigned to suppress insurrections, a task in which he was successful.

Mouton died in Paris in 1838

References

External links

 About general Georges Mouton, from the website arcdetriomphe.info

1770 births
1838 deaths
People from Phalsbourg
Counts of the First French Empire
Politicians from Grand Est
Orléanists
Members of the Chamber of Peers of the Hundred Days
Members of the Chamber of Deputies of the Bourbon Restoration
Members of the 1st Chamber of Deputies of the July Monarchy
Members of the 2nd Chamber of Deputies of the July Monarchy
Members of the 3rd Chamber of Deputies of the July Monarchy
Members of the Chamber of Peers of the July Monarchy
Marshals of France
French military personnel of the French Revolutionary Wars
French commanders of the Napoleonic Wars
Burials at Père Lachaise Cemetery
Names inscribed under the Arc de Triomphe